Lynn Goldsmith (born 1948) is an American recording artist, film director, celebrity portrait photographer, and rock and roll photographer. She has also made fine art photography with conceptual images and with her painting. Books of her work have been published by Taschen, Rizzoli, and Abrams. In 1985, she received a World Press Photo award. In the 1980s, she wrote songs and performed as Will Powers.

Andy Warhol Foundation for the Visual Arts, Inc. v. Goldsmith is a pending U.S. Supreme Court case that deals with the Prince Series created by Warhol based on a photograph by Goldsmith of the musician Prince, and questions whether Warhol's changes were sufficiently transformative from Goldsmith to fall within fair use.

Early life 
Goldsmith was born in Detroit, Michigan. She attended the University of Michigan, where she graduated in three years with two degrees in English and Psychology.

Career 
After college, Goldsmith worked for Elektra Records. In 1971, she met Joshua White and worked with him as a director for Joshua TV. That same year, Goldsmith was inducted into the Directors Guild of America. In 1972, she directed ABC's In Concert. After directing a documentary piece on Grand Funk Railroad for ABC, she made a film on Grand Funk called We're an American Band in 1973. This led to her becoming the band's co-manager.

In the mid-1970s, she left managing and directing to focus on her photography. Goldsmith founded the photo agency LGI, that represented images of famous people in the entertainment industry. During that time, she also wrote songs and performed as Will Powers, and was signed to Island Records. In 1997, Goldsmith sold LGI to Corbis so she could concentrate more fully on her fine art photography and work with the Will Powers Institute.

She chronicled the lives of Bruce Springsteen, Michael Jackson, Bob Dylan, Patti Smith, and the Rolling Stones' stadium tours. Her photographs have appeared on the covers of magazines and have been used for book and album covers.

Andy Warhol Foundation for the Visual Arts, Inc. v. Goldsmith

In 2016 the Andy Warhol Foundation filed a Pre-Emptive lawsuit in Federal Court against Goldsmith who then countersued citing copyright infringement of a portrait of Prince she'd taken in 1981; The Foundation argued that Warhol's "fair use" of the image was under copyright law because Warhol "transformed" the image.

The Warhol Foundation won in Federal Court and Goldsmith appealed and won in The Second Circuit Court of Appeals which the Warhol Foundation appealed and Goldsmith won again. The Warhol Foundation then filed an appeal to the Supreme Court (SCOTUS). The case was heard on October 20, 2022. The decision of the court will affect all of the arts and that is why Goldsmith claims she took on this costly legal battle over the 6 years. The decision is expected from SCOTUS by May 2023.

Publications
Springsteen. Sidgwick & Jackson, 1985. .
New Kids. Rizzoli, 1990. .
Circus Dreams. Rizzoli, 1991. .
Marky Mark. Harper Perennial, 1992. .
Photodiary: A Musical Journey. Rizzoli, 1995. .
Flower. Rizzoli, 2000. .
Springsteen: Access All Areas. Rizzoli, 2000. .
Rock and Roll. Abrams, 2007. .
The Police: 1978–1983. Little, Brown, 2007. .
The Looking Glass. Insight, 2011. .
Rock and Roll Stories. Abrams, 2013. .
KISS: 1977–1980. Rizzoli, 2017. .
Patti Smith: Before Easter After. Taschen, 2019.
Music in the '80s. Rizzoli, 2022. .

Awards
1985: World Press Photo, People in the News, 3rd prize
2021: Achievement in Portraiture, Lucie Awards

References

External links 
 
 Goldsmith Interviews The Police
 Goldsmith photo shoot with Elvira
 Dyna-Lite Photography Flash Equipment, Lynn Goldsmith

Living people
1948 births
Artists from Detroit
American photographers
University of Michigan College of Literature, Science, and the Arts alumni
Songwriters from Michigan
American new wave musicians
Film directors from Michigan
American women photographers
21st-century American women